Gossip is a 2000 Swedish comedy/drama film. It was directed and written by Colin Nutley.

Plot 

Ten actresses screen test for the title role of a remake of Queen Christina.

Cast 

 Pernilla August ... as Molly Fischer
 Helena Bergström ... as Stella Lindberg
 Lena Endre ... as Rebecca Olsson-Frigårdh
 Stina Ekblad ... as Eivor Pellas
 Harriet Andersson	... Camilla Steen
 Ewa Fröling ... Georgina Seth
 Margaretha Krook ... Ingrid Seth
 Marika Lagercrantz ... Karin Kalters

External links

2000 films
2000 comedy-drama films
2000s Swedish-language films
Films directed by Colin Nutley
Swedish comedy-drama films
2000s Swedish films